Notre-Dame-d'Épine is a commune in the Eure department and Normandy region of France.

Population

See also
Communes of the Eure department

References

External links

 Notre-Dame-d'Épine on the site of the office de tourisme du canton de Brionne (French)

Communes of Eure